AEL Mining Services is a company based in Johannesburg.  The company's principal activity is the manufacture of explosives.  It serves the mining and construction industries throughout Africa.  Its original name, African Explosives Limited, is abbreviated to AEL.

History
AEL was founded in 1896 at Modderfontein after gold was discovered at Witwatersrand.

It later expanded in the early 2000s.

Operations
AEL Mining Services is linked to the AECI Group, a chemical company of South Africa.  The company operates manufacturing facilities in Ghana, Mali, Tanzania, Ethiopia, Zambia, Zimbabwe and Botswana.  Its stock is listed on the Lusaka Stock Exchange in Zambia.

See also 
List of companies traded on the JSE
List of companies of South Africa
Economy of South Africa

References

External links
AEL website

Explosives manufacturers
Manufacturing companies based in Johannesburg